The Italian photographer Gianni Berengo Gardin (born 1930) has been the sole contributor or a major contributor to a large number of photobooks from 1960 to the present.

Berengo Gardin's photobooks have included those for Touring Club Italiano (TCI) about regions within and outside Italy; multiple, TCI-unrelated books about particular parts of Italy, some of them lesser known (e.g. Polesine); books about particular artists (e.g. Giorgio Morandi); books about architecture (particularly that by Renzo Piano); and other commissioned publications (particularly for Istituto geografico De Agostini and Olivetti).

A large book published in 2013, Gianni Berengo Gardin. Il libro dei libri (Gianni Berengo Gardin: The book of books), introduces books with contributions by Berengo Gardin, presenting their covers and sample page spreads, and providing brief bibliographical information.

Highlights

In the citation for Berengo Gardin's honorary doctorate (2009), the University of Milan singled out the books Morire di classe (1969, with ); Dentro le case (1977); Dentro il lavoro (1978); Un paese vent'anni dopo (1973, with Cesare Zavattini); In treno attraverso l'Italia (1991, with Ferdinando Scianna and Roberto Koch); Italiani (1999); and Reportage in Sardegna (2006).

India dei villaggi (1981) won the Scanno prize; La disperata allegria (1994) won the Leica Oskar Barnack Award at Rencontres internationales de la photographie d'Arles; and Zingari a Palermo (1997) won the Oscar Goldoni prize.

Asked to pick the one book of his that he would like to be known two hundred years into the future, Berengo Gardin was unable to decide among Italiani; a book on rice cultivation; and Morire di classe.

Books by or with contributions by Berengo Gardin

1960s
 On the Ferrarese architect Biagio Rossetti; photography by Berengo Gardin; text by Bruno Zevi; 728 pages.
 On the houses on the Grand Canal in Venice; photography by Berengo Gardin, text by Giorgia Scattolin; 60 pages.
Agenda. Venezia 1962. Ente Turismo Venezia. A diary with photography by Berengo Gardin; 110 pages.
 Photography by Berengo Gardin; 68 pages.
 Photographers include Berengo Gardin, who contributes 1 colour and 18 B/W photographs; introduction by Sergio Bettini; 272 pages. About Venice and its lagoon.
 Text by Guido Perocco; 55 pages.
 Photographers include Berengo Gardin, who contributes 2 colour and 18 B/W photographs; text by Giuliano Manzutto; edited by Alessandro Cruciani; introduction by Giovanni Comisso; 256 pages. About the Veneto.
Venise des saisons = Venedig: Stadt auf 118 Inseln
 Texts by Giorgio Bassani and Mario Soldati; 112 B/W photographs by Berengo Gardin; 194 pages. Ten thousand + 30 copies printed. Berengo Gardin describes Una storia d'amore: Venezia (1981) Gli anni di Venezia (1994) and Venezia (2004) as new editions of this book.
 194 pages.
 Translated from the Italian by Marianne and Josef Keller; 116 pages.
Toscana
About Tuscany.
About the region of Tuscany.
About .
 About Sante Monachesi; photographs by Berengo Gardin and Fulvio Roiter, texts by Alfredo Anitori, Monachesi, et al.; 76 pages.
 About a building in Rome for the RAI. Photographs by Berengo Gardin, texts in Italian and English by Giuseppe Mazzariol,  and Marziano Bernardi; 80 pages.
Edited by Giuliano Manzutto and Alessandro Cruciani; 219 B/W and 8 color photographs by Berengo Gardin, additional photographs by Ezio Quiresi; 256 pages. About the region of Apulia.
About Tuscany.
  10000+30 copies. French translation by Colette Gardaz. Not sold to the public.
 Trade edition.
 Text by Giuseppe Mazzariol; 114 pages.
 Edited by Emilio Bianchi and Alessandro Cruciani; introduction by Mario Praz; 89 B/W and 2 colour photographs by Berengo Gardin; 256 pages. About Lazio.
 Edited by Gian Vittorio Castelnovi, et al.; includes 36 B/W photographs by Berengo Gardin; 492 pages. About Liguria. (Not to be confused with the 1969 book Liguria.)
About Basilicata and Calabria.
  For the Touring Club Italiano.  Edited by Emilio Bianchi; 129 B/W and 6 colour photographs by Berengo Gardin; 256 pages. About Trentino–Alto Adige.
 Photographs by Berengo Gardin, text by Giuseppe Marchiori; 60 pages. About the Cadorin family of architects and artists.
 Text by Giuseppe Marchiori; 50 pages.
 Includes 42 B/W photographs by Berengo Gardin; text by Giovanni Arpino, Riccardo Bacchelli et al.; 498 pages. Published for Banca Nazionale del Lavoro. About Piedmont and the Aosta valley.
  88 B/W photographs by Berengo Gardin; text by Mario Minardi and Ermanno Franchetto; 156 pages.  About Canavese.
The title means "To die because of your class: The condition of asylums". 10,313 copies published; 8092 copies sold. (See also Morire di classe.)
 3958 copies published; 2575 copies sold.
 Issue 16 of the journal Sconfinamenti. This is the same as the first edition, with the addition of texts by the sociologist of politics Maria Grazia Giannichedda and the journalist and photographer Claudio Ernè, as well as an editorial note; its publisher makes it available as a PDF file.
 Catalogue of an exhibition held by Berengo Gardin,  and Toni Nicolini held at the gallery "Il Diaframma" in Milan in November 1968; 32 pages; with 11 B/W photographs by Berengo Gardin.
 About the Olivetti plant in Pozzuoli, with 20 photographs by Berengo Gardin and other photographs by Henri Cartier-Bresson; 34 pages.
 Includes 22 B/W photographs by Berengo Gardin; introduction by Carlo Bo; 272 pages. About Liguria. (Not to be confused with the 1967 book Liguria.)

1970s
Album no. 12. Edited by Bill Jay. London: Album, 1970. . Much of issue 12 of the photography magazine Album is devoted to Berengo Gardin, Édouard Boubat and Elliott Erwitt. Berengo Gardin has 13 B/W photographs.
 Photography by Berengo Gardin (35 B/W photographs), Mario Mulas and Fulvio Roiter; text . Text in German, English, French, Italian and Spanish; 205 pages. About Ivrea.
 160 B/W photographs by Berengo Gardin; text by Giuseppe Marchiori, Guido Perocco, and Sandro Zanotto; 208 pages. About Venice.
 113 B/W photographs by Berengo Gardin, text by Cesare Colombo; 152 pages. Berengo Gardin describes this as the first anthology of a variety of his work.
About Sardinia.
 57 B/W and 1 colour photographs by Berengo Gardin, other contributions by Pepi Merisio, Paolo Monti, and others; introduction by Ettore Paratore; 256 pages. About Abruzzo and Molise.
 246 B/W and 2 colour photographs by Berengo Gardin; other photographs by Elio Ciol and others; introduction by Biagio Marin; edited by Emilio Bianchi and Giuliano Manzutto; 256 pages. About Friuli-Venezia Giulia.
 263 B/W and 12 colour photographs by Berengo Gardin, text by Giuseppe Marchiori, with an essay by Sandro Zanotto; 54 pages. About Polesine. Some of the material here was reworked into a different book of the same title, published in 2008 (see below).
 68 B/W and 3 colour photographs by Berengo Gardin; other photographs by Paolo Monti and others; introduction by Paolo Volpone; 256 pages. About the Marche.
 160 photographs by Berengo Gardin, other photographs by Pepi Merisio, Paolo Monti, et al.; essays by Cesare Brandi and Franco Mancuso. On the piazze of Italy; 192 pages.
 Photography by Berengo Gardin, text by Cesare Rodi, edited by Ente Provinciale Turismo (Como); 30 pages. About Lake Como.
  Edited by Giuliano Manzutto and Emilio Bianchi; introduction by Carlo Bo; 240 pages. About Milan.
 211 colour photographs by Berengo Gardin, commentary by Giovanni Arpino; 227 pages. About the farmhouses of Europe.
 227 pages.

 90 B/W photographs by Berengo Gardin, essay by Giuseppe Zander, introduction by Giovanni Fallani; 192 pages. About abbeys and convents.
 Text by Giovanni Arpino, 270 B/W and 16 colour photographs by Berengo Gardin; 290 pages. About Spain.
 In Dutch and French.
 Photography by Berengo Gardin and texts by Antonio Amaduzzi and Cesare Zavattini; 150 pages.
 Photography by Berengo Gardin and texts by Antonio Amaduzzi and Cesare Zavattini; 150 pages.
 Text by Enzo Bettiza, 46 B/W photographs by Berengo Gardin; color photography by Novosti Press Agency; 64 pages. About Moscow.
 110 B/W and 22 colour photographs by Berengo Gardin, texts by Diego Valeri, etchings by Michele Marieschi; 116 pages. About Venice. Edition of 3500, not sold to the public.
 Photography by Berengo Gardin and texts by Giuseppe Marchiori; 96 pages. On the wood sculpture of the Vallazza family.
About France.
 By Sante Monachesi, Emilio Villa, Elverio Maurizi, Anna Caterina Toni; photographs by Augusto Bellavita, Berengo Gardin, and Fulvio Roiter; edited by Magdalo Mussio; 105 pages.
 Photography by Berengo Gardin, Giuseppe Bruno and others; 100 pages. About Emilio Vedova.
 197 B/W and 20 colour photographs by Berengo Gardin; edited by Aurelio Natali. About Greece.
 124 B/W and 47 colour photographs by Berengo Gardin; text by Giovanni Giudici On the Tiber.
 Text by Cesare Zavattini and 147 B/W photographs by Berengo Gardin; 175 pages. Revisiting the places in and near Luzzara photographed by Paul Strand in Strand's book Un Paese, twenty years later.

About Ivan Rabuzin.

 269 B/W photographs by Berengo Gardin and Luciano D'Alessandro; contributions by Cesare Zavattini, Giuseppe Alario, and Pasquale Carbonara; 263 pages. Published for Società Generale Immobiliare –  in 1977 and as a trade edition one year later. Berengo Gardin photographed Italy from Rome northwards, D'Alessandro from Rome southwards.
 36 B/W photographs by Berengo Gardin, text by Ezio Bacino; 298 pages.
 272 B/W and 17 colour photographs of Britain by Berengo Gardin; introduction by Alberto Moravia; 288 pages.
 Supplement of Fotografia italiana no. 234, February 1978. 42 B/W photographs of Britain by Berengo Gardin, edited and with an interview by Gabriele Basilico; 32 pages.
 About workers. Photographs by Berengo Gardin and Luciano D'Alessandro; preface by Cesare Zavattini; contributions by Bruno Corà and Gianni Giannotti; 290 pages. Published for Società Generale Immobiliare – Sogene in 1978 and as a trade edition one year later. Berengo Gardin photographed Italy from Rome northwards, D'Alessandro from Rome southwards.
 Photographs by Berengo Gardin; 52 pages.
 251 B/W and 50 colour photographs by Berengo Gardin; text by Giacomo Corna Pellegrini et al.; 208 pages. About farmhouses.
 About emigration from Sicily to the mainland.
 Photographs by Berengo Gardin (81 B/W) and others, text by Ezio Bacino; 168 pages. On funerary and cemetery architecture in Italy.
 The May 1979 issue is a Berengo Gardin special; pages 15 to 61 are devoted to him.

1980s
 Text by Renzo Piano, Magda Arduino and Mario Fazio; 188 B/W photographs by Berengo Gardin; 256 pages.
 Photographs (300 B/W, 38 colour) by Berengo Gardin; text by Antonio Monroy; 162 pages. About the villages of India.
 A portfolio. Edition of 1000.
 Photographs by Berengo Gardin, text by Paola Mazzarelli; 47 B/W plates plus 17 additional pages.
 32 pages.
 187 B/W and 12 colour photographs by Berengo Gardin, introduction by Giorgio Bocca; 232 pages. About Yugoslavia.
 132 B/W photographs by Berengo Gardin, stories by Giorgio Soavi; 131 pages. Berengo Gardin describes this as one of several new editions of Venise des saisons (1965).
About  in Cagliari.
 Photographs by Berengo Gardin, text by Giusa Marcialis; 207 pages. About Sardinia.
 15 B/W photographs by Berengo Gardin; other photographs by Mario Cresci, Roberto Salbitani, Franco Fontana, Luigi Ghirri, Mimmo Jodice, and Antonia Mulas; 120 pages. Catalogue of an exhibition held in Naples, December 1981 – January 1982. About Naples.
 39 B/W photographs by Berengo Gardin, text by Arrigo Benedetti and Franco Bonelli; 110 pages. For and about the Piombino-based company .
 , ; 60 pages.
On Finland, Norway and Sweden.
About central Italy.
 10 B/W photographs by Berengo Gardin; others by other photographers; text in Italian and English; 108 pages. About San Francisco and Venice.
 205 colour photographs by Berengo Gardin; contributions by Antonello Negri, Cesare de Seta, Mila Leva Pistoi, Pietro Cordara, Leonardo Di Mauro, Maria Flora Giubilei, Patrizia Chierici, and others. About the industrial archaeology of Italy.
About West Germany and Berlin.
 34 colour photographs by Berengo Gardin, texts by Pier Paolo Bendetto and Massimo Dimi; 123 pages.
 35 colour photographs by Berengo Gardin; 52 pages. And later editions.
 Photographs by Berengo Gardin, edited by Massimo Dimi; 246 pages. About the architecture of Renzo Piano. ; .

 Berengo Gardin is one of 11 photographers collected here; edited by Raffaello Cecchi; 132 pages.
 35 B/W photographs by Berengo Gardin; 160 pages. Accompanying a travelling exhibition by IBM Italia.
 22 B/W photographs by Berengo Gardin; edited by Antonio Amaduzzi and Berengo Gardin; 112 pages. About the painter Aldo Amaduzzi.
 15 B/W photographs by Berengo Gardin, others by other photographers; edited by Bruno Dolcetta; 220 pages.
 About the Veneto. Edited by Enrico Sturani, texts by Goffredo Parise, Mario Rigoni Stern and Giuliano Riavez; 4 B/W and 51 colour photographs by Berengo Gardin; 188 pages. A school book.
 61 B/W photographs by Berengo Gardin, others by Toni Nicolini; text in Italian and English by Carlo Tognoli, edited by Rossella Bigi; 136 pages. Along canals.
 99 photographs by Berengo Gardin for Il Mondo; 108 pages. Preface by Carlo Tognoli. Catalogue of an exhibition held in Palazzo Dugani, Milan, January–February 1985. (The title can also be read as Il Mondo.)
 77 B/W photographs by Berengo Gardin, seven colour photographs by Gabriele Basilico; texts (in Italian and English) by Gianni Roggini, Giovanna Calvenzi, and Cesare Colombo; 112 pages. About Fiera internazionale di Milano.
 Photographs by Enzo Bassotto, Berengo Gardin, Ken Damy and Franco Fontana; texts by Giuliana Scimè and Giampaolo Ferrari; 47 pages.
 Texts by  et al.; photographs by Berengo Gardin (14 B/W) et al.; 167 pages. On the arts and labour along the Adda.
 In Italian and English; text by Alberto Fumagalli; photographs by Berengo Gardin (35 B/W), Francesco Radino, Fumagalli and others; 137 pages. Not sold to the public.
 Ten B/W photographs by Berengo Gardin; also photographs by other photographers; edited by Italo Zannier; 147 pages. Accompanying an exhibition about Trieste, Trouver Trieste (sponsored by the city of Trieste and ), held at the Eiffel tower from November 1985 to June 1986.
 Edited by Enrico Sturani, text by Mario Tobino, Salvatore Tarallo, and Chiara Terrachiano; six B/W and 130 colour photographs by Berengo Gardin. About Tuscany; 178 pages. A school book.
 77 B/W photographs by Berengo Gardin, 36 pages of text by Giampaolo Pansa; 118 pages. Edition of 1500. A book about the stock exchange, banks and finance, made for the Florence-based Banca Mercantile Italiana.
 39 B/W photographs by Berengo Gardin, text by Arrigo Benedetti and Franco Bonelli; 110 pages. For and about the Piombino-based company .
 About Rome; 225 colour photographs by Berengo Gardin; 320 pages.
 312 pages.
 Photographs by Berengo Gardin, Enzo Carli and Raffaello Scatasta.
 Photographs by Berengo Gardin, text by Ugo Pizzarello and Ester Capitanio. On Dorsoduro and Giudecca.
Not sold to the public.
Edition of 3000, not sold to the public. About energy in Milan.
 22 B/W photographs by Berengo Gardin; other photographs by Gabriele Basilico and Francesco Radino; texts by Daniele Baroni, Giovanni Bettini, Aldo Castellano, et al.; 160 pages. Not sold to the public.
 109 B/W photographs by Berengo Gardin; 128 pages; about Scanno, Abruzzo.
 84 B/W photographs by Berengo Gardin; other photographs by Rossella Bigi; 140 pages; about agriculture in the Milan area.
 Texts by Giovanni Arpino and Bruno Quaranta; photographs by Berengo Gardin and others; 238 pages.
 From the OCLC record: "This catalogue has been publ. to coincide with the exhibition 'Renzo Piano: the process of architecture' held at the 9H Gallery, London, from 16 January to 15 February 1987"; 20 pages. On the architecture of Renzo Piano.
 Accompanying an exhibition at Rencontres internationales de la photographie d'Arles, July–August 1987. 21 B/W photographs by Berengo Gardin; text by Guy Mandery; 54 pages.
 Text by Maria Raffaella Fiory Ceccopieri.
 Photographs by Berengo Gardin, text by Ugo Pizzarello and Ester Capitanio. ; ; 317 pages. On Santa Croce and San Polo.
 29 B/W photographs by Berengo Gardin. Photographs from the 1950s of women.
 29 B/W photographs by Berengo Gardin. Photographs from the 1960s of women.
 29 B/W photographs by Berengo Gardin. Photographs from the 1970s of women.
 12 B/W photographs by Berengo Gardin; other photographs by Aldo Beltrame, Carlo Bevilacqua, Gianni Borghesan, Giuseppe Bruno, Toni Del Tin, Luciano Ferri, Giovanni Nogaro, Fulvio Roiter, Riccardo Toffoletti and Italo Zannier; edited by Italo Zannier; 186 pages.
 By Associazione Sindicale Intersind; texts by Agostino Pace and Italo Zannier; 16 B/W photographs by Berengo Gardin; 176 pages. Catalogue of an exhibition held in San Michele a Ripa, Rome in January 1989.
 Edited by Romeo Martinez, texts by Giovanni Chiaramonte and Italo Zannier, photographs by Berengo Gardin; 346 pages.
 348 pages. (Note the change of title.)
And later editions.
 And at least one later edition.
 And at least one later edition.
 162 colour and 32 B/W photographs by Berengo Gardin, text by Tudy Sammartini, Paolo Barbaro, Giovanni Caniato et al. 310 pages. On the smaller islands of the Venetian lagoon.
 162 colour and 32 B/W photographs by Berengo Gardin; texts by Lynn Heigl and David Freeman; 104 pages. About IBM's major European customers.
 30 B/W photographs by Berengo Gardin; text by Augusto G. Bertolini; 36 pages. Published in collaboration with Kodak Italia for Photokina 1988. About rail stations at night. The front cover reads "G. Berengo Gardin". One of a set of three volumes, the others by Ferdinando Scianna and Franco Fontana.
 72 B/W photographs by Berengo Gardin; text by Arturo Carlo Quintavalle and Cesare Stevan; 204 pages. Not sold to the public. About Cinisello Balsamo.
Published by and for IBM; not sold to the public.
 84 B/W photographs by Berengo Gardin, text by Alfred Hohenegger and Marina Miraglia; 90 pages. About typography. About the printing company run by the parents of the publisher, Mario Peliti, which was about to close.
About the lives of the drivers for the Domenichelli courier company.
 Presentation by Federico Zeri. 87 colour photographs by Berengo Gardin; 124 pages. A portrait of Italy in colour.
About Palazzo Marino.
 Photographs by Berengo Gardin, concept and text by Eliseo Fava, graphic design by Ferruccio Dragoni; 34 pages.
 112 B/W photographs of women by Berengo Gardin, edited by Giorgio Soavi. Catalogue of an exhibition held in Rome in 1989.
 Photographs by Berengo Gardin, text by Ugo Pizzarello and Ester Capitanio. 304 pages. On Cannaregio and Castello.

1990s
 67 B/W photographs by Berengo Gardin, other photographs by Rossella Bigi; 238 pages.
 Photographs by Berengo Gardin, text by Ugo Pizzarello and Ester Capitanio. 285 pages. On San Marco.
 46 colour and 29 B/W photographs by Berengo Gardin; 114 pages. About Olivetti.
 34 photographs (B/W and colour) by Berengo Gardin; pages not numbered. About De Agostini.
 34 photographs (B/W and colour) by Berengo Gardin; pages not numbered.
Essere Fotografia, August 1990. Pages 16–40 are devoted to Berengo Gardin.
 Photography by Berengo Gardin, Mario Cresci, Mimmo Jodice, Toni Nicolini, George Tatge. Catalogue of an exhibition held at Foligno.
About Cesare Zavattini and his life in Luzzara.
About train journeys across Italy.
About the autostrade of Italy.
Corso di fotografia. Gianni Berengo Gardin. Supplement to Tutti fotografi, November 1992. 53 B/W photographs by Berengo Gardin; 32 pages.
 Photographs by Berengo Gardin, edited by Michele Petrantoni; 385 pages. About Cimitero Monumentale of Milan.
 Text by Davide Mengacci, 28 B/W photographs by Berengo Gardin, 162 pages. About the television programme Scene da un matrimonio.
 10 B/W photographs by Berengo Gardin, 100 pages. About Procter & Gamble Italia.
 67 B/W photographs by Berengo Gardin, 100 pages. About Procter & Gamble Italia.
 61 B/W photographs by Berengo Gardin; 79 pages.
 150 B/W photographs by Berengo Gardin; text by Peter Buchanan; 240 pages. On the works of Renzo Piano.
 28 B/W photographs by Berengo Gardin; other photographs by Gabriella Nessi Parlato; texts by Guido Ceronetti, Susanna Berengo Gardin and Emilio Mazza; 103 pages. About the Monumental Cemetery of Staglieno.
 37 B/W photographs by Berengo Gardin, texts by Iosif Brodskij; 69 pages. Berengo Gardin describes this as one of several new editions of Venise des saisons (1965).
 152 B/W photographs by Berengo Gardin; introduction by Günter Grass in Italian and Romani; text in Italian and English by Stefano Francolini, Bianca La Penna and Margherita Pia Francolini; edited by Gabriella Nessi Parlato; 174 pages; published for the exhibition Gianni Berengo Gardin, un Nomade Fotografo, held at Giardino delle Oblate, Florence, in October 1994. About Romani people in Florence.
 Published by Ferrovie dello Stato and Peliti Associati. Photographs by Berengo Gardin and Gabriele Basilico; texts by Piero Spila and Diego Mormorio; 121 pages. Published on the occasion of the exhibition Ring, Galleria d'arte moderna, Bologna, 1994.
 Photographs by Berengo Gardin, Gabriella Nessa Parlato, Makis Vovlas, Cosmo Laera; text by Giovanna Calvenzi.
 204 B/W photographs by Berengo Gardin; with a contribution by Rossella Bigi and texts by Romolo Continenza and Aldo Benedetti; in Italian and English; 13 pages plus 202 photographs. About L'Aquila.
 63 B/W photographs by Berengo Gardin, in Italian and English; 120 pages. About sculptures by Giò Pomodoro.
 Text by Alfonso Alessandrini, Ennio De Concini, Edoardo Micati; photographs by Berengo Gardin; 107 pages. About dry stone building in Italy.
 Photographs by Berengo Gardin, edited by Cristiana Moldi Ravenna; in Italian and English; 98 pages. According to the OCLC entry, "Catalog of an exhibition held near the islands of San Giorgio Maggiore, San Servolo, and San Lazzaro degli Armeni, Venice, June 8 – July 31, 1995. 'Cascina Stal Vitale' ". Subtitle means "Works of art for the Venetian lagoon".
 16 photographs by Berengo Gardin, 12 pages.
 17 B/W and 2 colour photographs by Berengo Gardin; other photographs by other photographers; 200 pages.
 8 B/W photographs by Berengo Gardin; other photographs by Antonio Biasiucci, Uliano Lucas, Gabriella Nessi Parlato, Franco Pinna, and Francesco Zizola; 77 pages.
 50 B/W photographs by Berengo Gardin, text by Giovanna Calvenzi in Italian, French and English; 91 pages. A personal look at the architect Renzo Piano.
 31 B/W photographs by Berengo Gardin, text by Tudy Sammartini, edited by Berengo Gardin and Gabriella Nessi Parlato; 99 pages. About Hutterites in America.
 Translated by Hans Mayr; 100 pages.
 In Italian and English; 28 B/W photographs by Berengo Gardin; text by Andrea Zanzotto, Marco Verità, Renato Polacca and others; edited by Cristiana Moldi-Ravenna; 195 pages. About the mosaic maker Angelo Orsoni and the art of the mosaic.
 Edited by Italo Zannier; texts by Elio Bartolini, Roberto Pirzio Biroli, Caterina Furlan, and others; photography by Gabriele Basilico, Gianantonio Battistella, Berengo Gardin, and others; 170 pages. Twenty years after the earthquakes of Ancona.
 Accompanying an exhibition held Centre de Conférences Albert Borschette, February–May 1996. 15 B/W photographs by Berengo Gardin; other photographs by Publifoto, and Tazio Secchiaroli; texts by Alberto Arbasino and Giuliana Scimé; text in Italian and French; 112 pages.
 Accompanied an exhibition held in Loreto, November–December 1995. 20 B/W photographs by Berengo Gardin; other photographs by Olivo Barbieri, Antonio Biasiucci, Mario Giacomelli and Angelo Mezzanotte; introduction by Enzo Carli; 124 pages.
 Accompanying an exhibition held in New York, October–November 1996. 5 B/W photographs by Berengo Gardin; other photographs by Gian Paolo Barbieri, Gabriele Basilico, Luigi Ghirri, Mario Giacomelli, Mimmo Jodice, Paolo Monti, Ugo Mulas, Federico Patellani, Ferdinando Scianna, Studio negri, and Antonio Biasiucci; with a text by Attilio Colombo.
 B/W photographs by Berengo Gardin; text in Italian, Slovene, English and German by Alessandro Sgaravatti; photographs by Berengo Gardin, 58 pages. About the wine producer Joško Gravner.
 B/W photographs by Berengo Gardin, text by Nico Staiti; 95 pages. About the Romani people in Palermo, and particularly their worship, as Muslims, of Saint Rosalia.
 26 B/W photographs by Berengo Gardin; 40 pages. About multiple sclerosis.
 Photographs by Berengo Gardin, René Burri, David Seymour, Herbert List, Henri Cartier-Bresson, Inge Morath, Bruno Barbey, Sergio Larraín, Erich Lessing and Leonard Freed; preface by Wolfgang Mielke; text in German, Italian and English; 96 pages.
 Catalogue of an exhibition held in Cervia in 1997. In Italian and English. Photographs by Berengo Gardin, Luigi Ghirri, Guido Guidi, Paolo Monti, George Tatge; edited by Roberta Valtorta; 95 pages. About Cervia.
 42 B/W photographs by Berengo Gardin; other photographs by Carla Cerati; edited by Franca Ongaro Basaglia; 77 pages. The title means "We must not forget: 1968: The reality of the asylums and Morire di classe". Although often described as a new edition of Morire di classe (1969), this has been radically revised, with a new format, different texts, different photograph selection, and identification of the photographer and place of each photograph: "It is an entirely new publication."
 66 B/W and 39 colour photographs by Berengo Gardin, text by Umberto Pappalardo; 104 pages of photographs plus 23 pages. About Pompeii.
 Translated by Michel Bresson.

About Ivrea and Olivetti from 1967 to 1985.
 74 B/W photographs by Berengo Gardin, edited by Guy Mandery; 111 pages. Not sold to the public, but instead presented by the publisher.
 Text in Italian, French and English by Giancarlo Perini; 12 pages of B/W photographs by Berengo Gardin; color photographs by Marcandrea Ferrari and Massimo Perini; 88 pages. About Carrozzeria Bertone.
 Text in Italian, French and English by Riccardo P. Felicioli; 12 pages of B/W photographs by Berengo Gardin; edited by Gaetano Derosa; 95 pages. About Walter de Silva and Alfa Romeo design.
 Text in Italian, French and English by Riccardo P. Felicioli; 12 pages of B/W photographs by Berengo Gardin; edited by Saveria Tolomeo; 93 pages. About Sergio Pininfarina and Carrozzeria Pininfarina.
 Text in Italian, French and English; edited by Saveria Tolomeo and Alessandra Finzi; 12 pages of B/W photographs by Berengo Gardin. About Bruno Sacco and Mercedes-Benz design.
 Photography by Berengo Gardin; 62 pages. Accompanied an exhibition at Galleria Minima Peliti Associati, June–July 1998.
 49 B/W photographs by Berengo Gardin; other photographs by Olivo Barbieri; texts by Marina Carta, Diego Mormorio and Attilio Brilli; 171 pages. About St. Peter's Basilica.
 Special edition for Esso Italia.

 Catalogue of an exhibition held for Milan Triennale in Milan, May–June 1998.
 By Giorgio Olmoti; 30 B/W photographs by Berengo Gardin; 192 pages.
 Co-sponsored by Egyptian Ministry of Culture, Egyptian National Center for the Fine Arts, 7th International Biennale of Cairo, Italian Ministry of Foreign Affairs, Italian Embassy in Cairo, Italian Cultural Institute of Cairo; accompanying an exhibition of Giò Pomodoro held for the seventh International Cairo Biennale, in Cairo, December 1998 – February 1999. 88 pages. An edition of 170 copies.
 7 B/W photographs by Berengo Gardin; other photographs by Toni Nicolini and others; 234 pages. About canal bridges in Milan and Pavia.
  On the Via Francigena from Reims to Rome; 43 pages. Circa 1998.
 Photographs by Berengo Gardin; introduction by Stefano Benni; edited by Susanna Berengo Gardin; 477 pages.
 Translated by Anne Bresson-Lucas.
 Text in German and English, translated by Yvette Wiesenthal and Anthony Vivis respectively.
 50 B/W photographs by Berengo Gardin; other photographs by Gabriele Basilico; 126 pages. About Parco Agricolo Sud Milano.
 Text in Italian, French and English by Giuliano Molineri; 12 pages of B/W photographs by Berengo Gardin; 115 pages. About Giorgetto Giugiaro, Fabrizio Giugiaro and Italdesign.
 By Manuela Fugenza; 61 B/W photographs by Berengo Gardin; 192 pages.

2000s

 About Andrea Pittini (of the Pittini Group). 25 B/W photographs by Berengo Gardin; text in Italian and English by Piero Fortuna; 160 pages.
 Text in Italian, French and English by George Mason; 12 pages of B/W photographs by Berengo Gardin; 96 pages. About Patrick Le Quément and Renault design.
 Text in Italian, French and English by Enrico Leonardo Fagone; 12 pages of B/W photographs by Berengo Gardin; 94 pages. About Franco Mantegazza and I.DE.A Institute.
About Chris Bangle and BMW Global Design.
 94 B/W photographs by Berengo Gardin, text by Arnaldo Colombo; 167 pages. On rice farming in Italy.
 Catalogue of an exhibition held at Museo Civico di Padova, June–October 2001. 151 B/W photographs by Berengo Gardin, text by Giovanna Calvenzi and Ferdinando Scianna; 195 pages.
 Text in Italian, French and English by Daniele Cornil; 12 pages of B/W photographs by Berengo Gardin; 95 pages. About Centro Stile Lancia.
 Text in Italian, English and French by Cristina Morozzi; 20 B/W photographs by Berengo Gardin; 96 pages. About .
 200 B/W photographs by Berengo Gardin; text by Alessandro Balducci and Maurizio Zanuso. About Cinisello Balsamo; 127 pages.
 86 B/W hotographs by Berengo Gardin; other photographs by Gabriella Nessi Parlato; text in Italian and English by Massimo Minella; 240 pages. About the port of Genoa.
 Catalogue of an exhibition held at Caffè Florian, Venice, May–June 2002. 18 B/W photographs by Berengo Gardin; text by Daniela Gaddo Vedaldi, Stefano Stipitivich and Alvise Zorzi.
 82 colour photographs by Berengo Gardin; text by Paolo Cipriani and Dario Girolami; 140 pages.
 Text in Italian, French and English by Marco Degl'Innocenti; 12 pages of B/W photographs by Berengo Gardin; 83 pages. About  and Volkswagen Design.
 Text in Italian, French and English by Andrea Zagato; 12 pages of B/W photographs by Berengo Gardin; other photographs by Simone Falcetta; 95 pages. About Zagato.
 Text in Italian, French and English; 12 pages of B/W photographs by Berengo Gardin; edited by Matt Davis; 95 pages. About Saab.
About 19th and 20th century funerary sculpture at the Monumental Cemetery of Staglieno, Genoa.
 Catalogue of an exhibition. Text in Italian and French; includes 15 B/W photographs by Berengo Gardin; 272 pages.
Photographs of Catania.
 Simultaneously published in Utrecht by Het Spectrum. Photographs by Berengo Gardin, 288 pages.
 Title also rendered as Dentro lo studio quel che c'è e si vede. 135 B/W photographs by Berengo Gardin; text in Italian and English by Ugo Nespolo; 151 pages. About Ugo Nespolo and his studio.
 53 B/W photographs by Berengo Gardin; preface by Guy Mandery; 64 pages.
 Text in Italian, French and English by Bruno Alfieri; 12 pages of B/W photographs by Berengo Gardin; 108 pages. About .
 Photography by Berengo Gardin; art direction and coordination by Ogilvy and Mather; 24 pages. About .
 Photography by Berengo Gardin, Antonella Pierno and Nicola Pice; text by Denis Curti; 50 pages.
 11 B/W photographs by Berengo Gardin; edited by Giovanna Calvenzi; 156 pages.

 18 B/W photographs by Berengo Gardin; photographs by various other photographers; text by various authors; 276 pages.
 Texts in Italian and English by Roberto Barzanti et al.; 6 B/W photographs by Berengo Gardin; also photographs by others; edited by Mauro Civai and Giovanni Santi; 190 pages. Published for the exhibition "Tre piazze d'Italia: Siena, Mantova e Pavia", held at Magazzini del Sale, Siena, August–September 2003. About Piazza del Campo, Siena.
 Preface by Berengo Gardin; edited by Alessandro Pasi; 160 pages.

 Revised edition.
 128 B/W photographs by Berengo Gardin; text by Enzo Viteritti and Denis Curti; 199 pages. About Corigliano Calabro.
About Mantua.
 70 B/W photographs by Berengo Gardin, texts by Gian Paolo Sassi, Francesco Lotito and Vittorio Crecco; 116 pages. About Istituto nazionale della previdenza sociale.
About the people and land of Tuscany. Accompanying an exhibition held in Fondazione Ragghianti (Lucca), July–October 2004.
 83 B/W photographs by Berengo Gardin; texts by Francesca Pompa and Mariangela Gritta Grainer; edited by Alberto Valentini; 230 pages. About businesswomen.
 Photographs by Berengo Gardin, 48 pages. About the sculptor  and the painter Girolamo Romanino; catalogue of an exhibition held at Pisogne.
 17 B/W photographs by Berengo Gardin; edited by Gabriele Lucci; text in Italian and English; 344 pages. About Dante Ferretti.
 Berengo Gardin describes this as one of several new editions of Venise des saisons (1965).
 11 B/W photographs by Berengo Gardin; edited by Giovanna Calvenzi; 156 pages. Accompanying an exhibition Palazzo del Quirinale / Scuderie Papali, June–August 2004.
 17 B/W photographs by Berengo Gardin; text by Cesare Colombo and Antonio Maraldi; 188 pages.
 Catalogue of an exhibition held in Bari, 2005–2006. 12 B/W photographs by Berengo Gardin; 300 pages.
 Catalogue of an exhibition at Pinacoteca Civica di Latina, October–December 2005. Photographs by Berengo Gardin; exhibition curated by Lydia Palumbo Scalzi; 142 pages. About Cesare Zavattini.
 In conversation with Goffredo Fofi and Frank Horvat, interview about books by Floriana Pagano; edited by Roberto Koch and Alessandra Mauro. A large (439 pages) hardback survey of Berengo Gardin's work.

  Translated from the Italian by Kareen Pinter and Martin Vincent Raynaud.  Contains "Journal intime d'Italie, un demi-siècle de photographies", dialogue de l'artiste avec Goffredo Fofi; 439 pages.  
 16 B/W photographs by Berengo Gardin; text by Umberto Cecchi and Flavio Arensi; 48 pages.
 Text by Vitale Zanchettin, 40 B/W photographs by Berengo Gardin, 211 pages. About Brion Cemetery and Carlo Scarpa.
 64 B/W photographs by Berengo Gardin; introduction by Giovanna Calvenzi. A compact paperback.
 Translated by Valérie Lermite; 144 pages.
 67 B/W photographs by Berengo Gardin; text by Fulvio Merlak, Giorgio Tani,  and Cinzia Busi Thompson; 96 pages. About Paris in 1954.
 98 B/W photographs by Berengo Gardin; text by Claudio Abbado and interview of Berengo Gardin by Peter Paul Kainrath, in Italian, German and English; 192 pages. About Gustav Mahler Jugendorchester and European Union Youth Orchestra. Catalogue of an exhibition held at Bolzano, July–October 2005.
 Co-published by Silvana (Cinisello Balsamo) and Montrasio arte (Monza); text in Italian and English; photographs by Berengo Gardin and Vitale Zanchettin; 30 pages. About the sculptor Fabrizio Pozzoli.
 Photography by Berengo Gardin, Michel Denancé and Stefano Goldberg; in Italian and English; edited by Domenico Potenza; 56 pages. About the Padre Pio church.
 80 pages. About the Hera Group.
 96 pages. Catalogue of a travelling exhibition, June–December 2005. About the Hera Group.
 Co-published by Montrasio (Monza, Milan); edited by Flavio Arensi and Ruggero Montrasio; photography by Berengo Gardin; poems by Alda Merini; text by Ada Masoero and others; 140 pages. About the works of the painter Andrea Martinelli.
 68 B/W photographs by Berengo Gardin, edited by Carla Costamagna Martino; 79 pages.
 34 B/W photographs by Berengo Gardin, curated by Maria Perosino; text by Giorgio Ficara; 47 pages. On the house and library of Giacomo Leopardi. Catalogue of an exhibition held in the Palazzo Ducale, Urbino, September–October 2006.
About Sardinia.
 (The title is also presented as Venezia.) B/W photographs of Venice by Berengo Gardin, text by Paolo Morello; 125 pages.
About Vicenza.
 Text by Flavio Arensi; photographs by Berengo Gardin; 175 pages. About the artist Graziella Marchi.
 Photographs by Berengo Gardin, Gabriele Basilico, Luca Campigotto; 133 pages.
 Photographs by Berengo Gardin, curated by Maddalena Scimemi; 36 pages. About Carlo Scarpa. Catalogue of an exhibition at the Museo Palladio, June–July 2006.
About the countryside around Giovo.
 Translated by John Venerella.
 112 pages.
 19 B/W photographs by Berengo Gardin, edited by Gabriele Lucci; text in Italian and English; 303 pages; includes Compact Disc. About Ennio Morricone.
 12 B/W photographs by Berengo Gardin; other photographs by Gabriele Basilico, Enrico Bossan, Lorenzo Cicconi Massi, Daniele Dainelli, Stefano De Luigi, Alex Majoli, Paolo Pellegrin, Massimo Siragusa and Riccardo Venturi; 240 pages.
 10 B/W photographs by Berengo Gardin; photographs by nine other photographers; 179 pages. About the river Po.
 Catalogue of an exhibition held at Casa Cavalier Pellanda, Biasca, December 2007 – February 2008. Photographs of Martinelli's studio by Berengo Gardin, text by Stefano Crespi; exhibition and catalogue curated by Marco Gurtner; 48 pages.
 Text in Italian and English; 72 B/W photographs by Berengo Gardin, curated by Silvia Pegoraro. 141 pages. About the painter and sculptor .
 93 B/W photographs by Berengo Gardin; text by Paolo Morello; 144 pages. On Polesine: a thematically organized new edition of some of the work that had appeared in the 1971 book Polesine.
About holy week and good Friday in Mantua.
 5 B/W photographs by Berengo Gardin; 32 pages. About the sculptor Fabrizio Pozzoli.
 Text in Italian and English by Carlo Zucchini and Silva Palombi; photographs by Berengo Gardin, 101 pages. About the studio of Giorgio Morandi.
 Text in Italian and English; edited by Arianna Fantoni; with 42 B/W photographs by Berengo Gardin; and photographs by Olivo Barbieri, Gabriele Basilico, Luca Campigotto and Ferdinando Scianna; 285 pages. About building stones in the region of Apulia.
 Catalogue of an exhibition held in Milan in 2008. Co-published in Cinisello Balsamo by Silvana and in Milano by Montrasio Arte. Text in Italian and English.
 Title also presented as Paladino. About the artist Mimmo Paladino.
 Catalogue of an exhibition at Arca, Vercelli, October–December 2009. 88 B/W photographs by Berengo Gardin, curated by Pina Inferrera; 127 pages. About Peggy Guggenheim.
 Catalogue of an exhibition held at Fondazione Pier Luigi e Natalina Remotti, Camogli, Italy, October 2009 – January 2010. 103 B/W photographs by Berengo Gardin; made with the collaboration of Donatella Pollini; text by Silvana Turzio; 144 pages. About Camogli.
 Photographs by Berengo Gardin, Lorenzo Trento and Bogdan Zupan; texts by Sergio Ivanissevich and Ignazio Vok; not paginated. About , Trieste.
 30 B/W photographs by Berengo Gardin; edited by Uber Calori; interview by Giuseppe Meroni; 70 pages.
 Photographs by Berengo Gardin; edited by Elisabetta Dal Carlo; 158 pages.
 Title is also rendered as Reportrait. Portrait photography: 215 B/W photographs by Berengo Gardin; text by Flavio Arensi; project by Flavio Arensi, Luca Caramella, Valeria Greppi; 254 pages.
 Text in Italian and English. 10 B/W photographs by Berengo Gardin; additional photographs by other photographers; text by Dario A. Franchini; 172 pages. About the river Po.
  10 B/W photographs by Berengo Gardin; other photographs by Gabriele Basilico, Luca Campigotto, Giovanni Chiaramonte, Mario Cresci, Mario De Biasi, Franco Fontana, Paolo Gioli, Guido Guidi, Mimmo Jodice, Fulvio Roiter and Marco Zanta.

2010s
 158 B/W photographs by Berengo Gardin, 240 pages. About the people of Milan.
 In Italian and English. Catalogue of an exhibition held at Palazzo Pichi Sforza, Sansepolcro, March–June 2010. 25 B/W photographs by Berengo Gardin; other photographs by Elliott Erwitt; edited by Stefano Curone; 96 pages. On the trail of Piero della Francesca in Arezzo, Anghiari and Sansepolcro.
 111 B/W photographs by Berengo Gardin; edited by Cristina Volpi; 128 pages. About Azienda Trasporti Milanesi.
 10 B/W photographs by Berengo Gardin; other photographs by Gabriele Basilico, Luca Campigotto and Andrea Jemolo. Curated by Domenico Potenza and Cosmo Laera, text in Italian and English by Carmen Andriani; 96 pages.
 By Paolo Morello, includes 21 B/W photographs by Berengo Gardin; two volumes, 560+272 pages.
 By Paolo Morello, includes 11 B/W photographs by Berengo Gardin; 280 pages.
 Text by Antonio Amaduzzi, includes 54 photographs by Berengo Gardin; 50 pages.
About  of Cesano Boscone.
 37 B/W photographs by Berengo Gardin; 54 pages.
 15 B/W photographs by Berengo Gardin; other photographs by Mosé Noberto Franchi, Luciano Marchi, Davide Ortombina, Donatella Pollini and Massimo Zanti; text by Gianluigi Colin, Renzo Zagnoni and Mosé Noberto Franchi; 96 pages
 105 B/W photographs by Berengo Gardin, edited by Valerio Iossa; 174 pages. About Figline Valdarno.
 Photographs by Berengo Gardin; 154 pages. About Andrea Martinelli.
 120 B/W photographs by Berengo Gardin; text by Ferdinando Scianna; contribution by Cesare Zavattini; 147 pages.
 Co-published by One Group in L'Aquila. 140 B/W photographs by Berengo Gardin, 147 pages. About the effects of the 2009 L'Aquila earthquake.
 130 B/W photographs by Berengo Gardin; additional photographs by other photographers; texts by Renzo Piano and Carlo Piano; 230 pages.
 206 B/W photographs by Berengo Gardin; text in Italian and English by Carlo Petrini, Gianni Rondolino and Marco Vallora; 307 pages. About rice farming in the Po valley.
 Catalogue of an exhibition held at Casa dei Tre Oci, Venice, February–May 2013. 133 B/W photographs by Berengo Gardin, text by Denis Curti and Italo Zannier; edited by Denis Curti; 205 pages.

 Catalogue of an exhibition held at the Royal Palace of Milan. 180 B/W photographs by Berengo Gardin; text by Denis Curti and Italo Zannier; 181 pages.
 40 B/W photographs by Berengo Gardin of Caffè Florian, prefaces by Andrea Formilli Fendi and Stefano Stipitivich, accompanying an exhibition curated by Stipitivich and held at Caffè Florian, September–October 2013; 93 pages.
About the Palazzo Madama, Turin.
 Eight B/W photographs by Berengo Gardin; 80 pages.
 93 B/W photographs by Berengo Gardin; text by Paolo Morello, Laura Negri and Tiziana Virgili; 140 pages.
 On the Po. 11 photographs by Berengo Gardin; other photographs by Stanislao Farri, Pepi Merisio, Ezio Quiresi, Roberto Roda, Roberto Bertoni, Luigi Briselli, Paolo Equisetto, Arrigo Giovannini, Alberto Roveri; 180 pages.
 14 photographs by Berengo Gardin; 150 pages.
 Edited by Bruno Carbone, with an introductory essay by Peter Galassi; 311 pages. A book about books by Berengo Gardin.
 Photographs by Berengo Gardin; text by Donatella Pollini and Domenico Nano; 96 pages.
 The friendship in silver chloride of Berengo Gardin and Elliott Erwitt. Tête-bêche binding, "Gianni Berengo Gardin" on one front cover and "Elliott Erwitt" on the other.
 71 B/W photographs by Berengo Gardin of the workshop of the fashion designer Erika Cavallini; text by Angelo Flaccavento in Italian and English; 120 pages.
 Text by Caterina Stiffoni with 30 B/W photographs by Berengo Gardin.
 88 pages; 40 B/W photographs by Berengo Gardin.
 . Photographs by Berengo Gardin, Irene Kung, Joel Meyerowitz, Martin Parr, Sebastião Salgado, Alessandra Sanguinetti, Ferdinando Scianna, George Steinmetz, Alex Webb.
 Published Milano: Skira; and Bagolino (Brescia): Studio d'arte Zanetti. On the artist Antonio Stagnoli. Text by Franca Grisoni and others, in Italian and English; edited by Mario Zanetti.
 Text by Alessandra Mammì and Alessandra Mauro.
 By Berengo Gardin, Marco D'Anna, Hugo Pratt, Marco Steiner.
 Text in Italian, German and English.
 By Berengo Gardin and Marco Minoja.

 By Cele Bellardone and Dino Boffa; with a translation, "The interview: Gianni Berengo Gardin in his own words".

 An autobiography.
 Short stories by Marco Steiner, photographs by Berengo Gardin and Marco D'Anna, postface by Antonio Dragonetto.

Books about Berengo Gardin
 48 B/W photographs of Berengo Gardin at work with his various cameras over the years; 64 pages.
 Text by Silvana Turzio; 26 B/W photographs by Berengo Gardin; 179 pages.

Notes

References

Bibliographies of people
Books of photographs
Italian books